Ronnie Milsap is the first studio album from country music artist Ronnie Milsap. It was released in 1971 on Warner Bros. Records.

Among the tracks on the album is "Please Don't Tell Me How the Story Ends", which he re-recorded in 1974 after he signed a contract with RCA Nashville and established himself as a hitmaker in country music. The remake went on to be a No. 1 hit on the Billboard Hot Country Singles chart.

Track listing

"Dedicate the Blues to Me" (Huey P. Meaux) – 3:20
"Sunday Rain" (Mark James) – 3:09
"Please Don't Tell Me How the Story Ends" (Kris Kristofferson) – 3:00
"Sweet Little Rock & Roller" (Chuck Berry) – 3:17
"Blue Skies of Montana" (Spooner Oldham, Dan Penn) – 5:29
"Sanctified" (Jim Dickinson, Bob McDill) – 3:33
"Keep on Smiling (1980)" (Karen Oldham, Spooner Oldham) – 3:21
"The Cat Was a Junkie" (Bobby Weinstein, Jon Stroll)
"Crying" (Joe Melson, Roy Orbison) – 2:30
"Not for the Love of a Woman" (Nat Foster) – 3:08
"Why" (Swain Schaefer) – 3:04

Personnel
Ronnie Milsap – vocals, keyboards
Eddie Hinton, Gimmer Nicholson, James Burton, Johnny Christopher, Reggie Young, Tippy Armstrong, Wayne Perkins – guitar
Chris Ethridge, Mike Leech, Norbert Putnam – bass
Bobby Emmons, Bobby Wood, David Briggs, Glen Spreen, Jim Dickinson, Swain Schaefer – Hammond B-3
Gene Chrisman, Kenny Buttrey, Roger Hawkins – drums
Hayward Bishop – percussion
Andrew Love, Wayne Jackson, Ed Logan – horns
The Black Berries – backing vocals
Glen Spreen - string arrangements
Technical
Dan Penn, Gene Eichelberger, Jim Johnson, Marlin Greene, Ralph Rhodes, Terry Manning – engineers
Ed Thrasher – art director
Jim Marshall – photography

References

1971 debut albums
Warner Records albums
Ronnie Milsap albums